The 1988 British Grand Prix (formally the XLI Shell Oils British Grand Prix) was a Formula One motor race held on 10 July 1988 at the Silverstone Circuit, Silverstone. It was the eighth race of the 1988 FIA Formula One World Championship.

The 65-lap race was won by Ayrton Senna, driving a McLaren-Honda, after starting from third position. The win, Senna's fourth of the season, moved him to within six points of teammate Alain Prost in the Drivers' Championship, Prost having retired before half distance with handling problems. Local driver Nigel Mansell finished second in a Williams-Judd, with Alessandro Nannini third in a Benetton-Ford.

To commemorate the 40th anniversary of the opening of the Silverstone Circuit, many facilities had been added to the circuit, including a Press Centre complex, an internal ring road, debris fencing, wide screens to show live action as broadcast by the BBC, and a 600-metre long hospitality tent for corporate guests. However, the weekend was overshadowed by the death of RAC Chief Executive Peter Hammond in a car crash on the way to the track.

Qualifying
After weeks of speculation, Nigel Mansell announced that he would race for Ferrari in the  season, encouraged to go to the Italian team by a series of high speed accidents on Friday as a result of problems with Williams' reactive suspension, as well as a streak of seven consecutive retirements.

Williams struggled during qualifying. With Mansell only 13th after the Friday session and Riccardo Patrese 30th and last, some 14 seconds from 26th place, the team's Technical Director Patrick Head made a snap decision to dump the reactive suspension until the end of the season. This they did overnight between the Friday and Saturday sessions of the event after previously telling both drivers that changing to the more conventional suspension was next to impossible without months of work. Head said in an interview on race morning that "It's a bodge frankly. We've put steel mechanical springs and dampers on. We've changed the front struts into dampers, designed some new bits and pieces which we machined up overnight. We did some new pistons for the front struts...it's a bit of a bodge as I said".

The grid had an unfamiliar look to it. The McLarens were suffering handling problems because of new bodywork introduced that was more suitable for high speed circuits coming up later in the season. Meanwhile, the Ferraris of Gerhard Berger and Michele Alboreto got the jump on everyone and occupied the front row of the grid. Berger's pole time of 1:10.133 was three seconds slower than the 1987 pole time set by Nelson Piquet. Although on pole, Berger was far from confident going into the race stating that the Ferraris could not live with the McLarens on fuel consumption, words echoed by Alboreto. For his part Alboreto secured his first front row start since he scored pole in the opening race of the  season in Brazil, it was the last time the Italian would start an F1 race from the front row. Senna and Prost qualified in 3rd and 4th place, the first time no McLaren had been on the front row of the grid since the 1987 Mexican Grand Prix and first time in 1988 that neither McLaren was on pole.

During the Friday qualifying session, Senna had two high speed spins at Stowe corner as both he and Prost searched in vain for balance with their cars' new bodywork. The team reverted to the cars having the turbo snorkels for the rest of the weekend which restored some of the cars' balance, but the time lost and the Ferraris with their better top end power put pole out of reach of even Senna. Further testing at Silverstone before the next race in Germany revealed other factors and not the missing snorkels were the cause of the cars' imbalance and the McLarens did not appear with the turbo snorkels for the rest of the season.

The naturally aspirated March-Judds impressed with Maurício Gugelmin qualifying 5th and Ivan Capelli 6th, ahead of the turbos of Lotus and Arrows, while Mansell and Patrese qualified in 11th and 15th respectively with Patrese almost 18 seconds quicker in Saturday qualifying than he was on Friday. Despite Patrick Head describing the converted suspension as a bodge, both Williams drivers expressed their delight at their cars' new 'conventional' suspension, saying it was amazing how much more confidence they had in their cars knowing that they would now behave the same way lap after lap and not different from lap to lap and sometimes corner to corner as it was with the reactive cars.

Both Zakspeed turbos failed to qualify for the race showing the cars' lack of handling and lack of power from the team's own 4 cylinder engines with Bernd Schneider the slowest of the 30 drivers, some 7.9 seconds slower than Berger's Ferrari. His experienced teammate Piercarlo Ghinzani fared little better, being almost 6 seconds slower than the Ferrari. Also failing to make the grid were the EuroBrun of Oscar Larrauri and the Ligier of Stefan Johansson, who complained of lack of grip from his JS31. The Coloni of Gabriele Tarquini failed to pre-qualify, despite setting a time faster than what Schneider managed in qualifying.

Race summary 
The race was held in pouring rain, the first wet race since the 1985 Belgian Grand Prix. Senna made an excellent start to tail Berger and Alboreto into the first turn. Alboreto had actually beaten Berger away but with the inside line the Austrian pulled ahead through Copse. Senna was soon past the Italian and challenging Berger for the lead. Prost made a poor start, falling back to ninth. On lap 3, Capelli dropped back with electrical trouble.

By lap 14 Gugelmin, Alessandro Nannini and Mansell were fighting for third place. On lap 14, Senna took the lead under the Bridge chicane, overtaking Berger and lapping a slow-running Prost at the same time. Using his skill in wet conditions, Senna managed to pull away and build a lead. On lap 20, Mansell overtook Nannini for fourth, after which the Italian spun at Club and let Gugelmin through. Two laps later, Mansell passed Alboreto for third. On lap 24 Prost retired, claiming handling problems of his McLaren.

Seeking out the wet parts of the track to cool his tyres, Mansell set the fastest lap of the race on lap 48, at an average speed of 206 km/h. On lap 50, he caught and passed Berger, then held second place until the finish, some 23 seconds behind Senna. Berger was suffering with a fuel deficit and was losing places rapidly. He finally ran out of fuel on the very last corner, dropping from 5th to 9th behind Piquet, Warwick, Cheever and Patrese. The same problem happened to Alboreto, who had run out of fuel on lap 63.

Nannini, despite two further spins, claimed his first Grand Prix podium finish. Gugelmin collected his first World Championship points, and Nelson Piquet and Derek Warwick rounded out the top six.

Mansell's fastest lap time of 1:23.308 was over 13 seconds slower than the lap record of 1:09.832 he set the previous year in dry conditions.

Classification

Pre-qualifying

Qualifying

Race

Championship standings after the race

Drivers' Championship standings

Constructors' Championship standings

References 

British Grand Prix
British Grand Prix
Grand Prix
British Grand Prix